Danielle Koenen (born 20 July 1968) is a Dutch field hockey player. She competed in the women's tournament at the 1992 Summer Olympics.

References

External links
 

1968 births
Living people
Dutch female field hockey players
Olympic field hockey players of the Netherlands
Field hockey players at the 1992 Summer Olympics
People from Uden
Sportspeople from North Brabant
20th-century Dutch women